The Helena May main building is a declared monument of Hong Kong home to the Helena May, a private member club located at No. 35 Garden Road, in Central of Hong Kong Island, Hong Kong. The present day building structure remains largely unchanged from its original building structure from 1914.

History
Constructed in 1914, the building was officially opened on 12September 1916 by Lady May, daughter of Lieutenant General George Digby Barker, British Commanding Officer in China and Hong Kong from 1890 to 1895, as a respite for unaccompanied women arriving in Hong Kong. In 1891, Helena Barker married Sir Francis Henry May, who would become Governor of Hong Kong in 1912. 

During World War II, the building was occupied by Axis Japanese forces and later requisitioned by the Royal Air Force at the end of the war until 1947.

In 1985, The Helena May started accepting male members.

Past chairs after World War II
 19 December 1946 - 9 April 1947 Josephine, Lady Young
 9 April 1947 - 12 October 1949 Mable M. Annett
 12 October 1949 - 9 May 1951 Mary A. Campbell
 9 May 1951 - 10 October 1951 Janet Adamson
 10 October 1951 - 22 October 1953 E. Frida Dunlop
 22 October 1953 - 21 October 1954 Gwendolyn Faber
 21 October 1954 - 20 October 1955 Ivy Sykes

References

External links

 Official website of Helena May
 Antiquities and Monuments Office: The Exterior of the Main Building, the Helena May
 

Central, Hong Kong
Declared monuments of Hong Kong